Douglas Beck (born 1964 or 1965) is an American politician. He is a member of the Missouri House of Representatives from the 92nd District, serving since 2017. He is a member of the Democratic Party. In the 2020 election cycle, he won the seat for Missouri Senate's 1st district, ascending from the Missouri House of Representatives and succeeding Scott Sifton.

Missouri House of Representatives 
During his time in the Missouri House of Representatives, in which he served from 2017 to 2021, he was the Ranking Member of the Economic Development and Workforce Development Committees and also served on the Veterans and Children and Families Committees.

Missouri State Senate 
Beck was elected in the 2020 Missouri State Senate elections, succeeding fellow Democrat Scott Sifton.

Committee assignments 

 Agriculture, Food Production and Outdoor Resources
 Commerce, Consumer Protection, Energy and the Environment
 Economic Development
 Professional Registration
 Small Business and Industry
 Joint Committee on Public Employee Retirement
 Career and Technical Advisory Council
 Missouri Health Facilities Review Commission
 Missouri Palliative Care and Quality of Life Interdisciplinary Council
Source:

Personal life 
He was born and raised in St. Louis County, and graduated from Lindbergh High School in 1983. He attended St. Louis Community College. He has 2 children and 3 grandchildren.

Electoral history

References

Living people
1960s births
Democratic Party members of the Missouri House of Representatives
Democratic Party Missouri state senators
21st-century American politicians